First Moscow State Medical University (MSMU, officially I.M. Sechenov First Moscow State Medical University, informally Moscow Medical Academy  or Sechenov University) is the oldest medical university in Russia, located in Moscow.

The university was founded in 1758 as medical faculty of Imperial Moscow University as the first medical school in Russia. The institution separated from the Moscow State University and became independent in 1930. The university was renamed after Russian physiologist, Ivan Sechenov, in 1955. It was known as I.M. Sechenov First Moscow Institute of Medicine until 1990, and I.M. Sechenov Moscow Medical Academy from 1990 to 2010. MSMU is located at Devichye Pole, a historical medical campus, in Moscow.

History

The university was inaugurated as the Imperial Moscow University (Moscow State University since 1917) in 1755. It is named after Ivan Sechenov, a doctoral graduate of Moscow Imperial, who is known as the "father of Russian physiology." The institution became independent in 1930 and acquired full university status in 2010. It celebrated its 260th anniversary in 2018.

The academy is a center for training, certification and further education for medical staff and pharmacists. About 1500 graduates are involved in post-graduate training as part of internship (primary specialization), clinical internship (residency), covering clinical specialities, or post-graduate courses. There are 160 chairs at the university.

It collaborates with various international organizations including the International Association of the University Programs for Health Management, the World Organization of National Colleges, Academies and General Practitioners, the American International Alliance on Health Problems, the European Association of Management in Health Care, the World Academy of Medical Education.

Faculties 
Faculty of Medicine
Faculty of Pharmacy
Faculty of Pediatrics
Faculty of Preventive Medicine
Faculty of Dentistry
Faculty of Postgraduate Professional Training of Physicians
Preparatory Department for International Applicants
Institute of Professional Education
Center of Master's Programs

Rankings

The university was ranked #651 in the world by QS World University Rankings in 2021, #983 in Best Global Universities by U.S. News & World Report in 2022, and #1,001 in THE World University Rankings - Times Higher Education in 2021.

Notable alumni 

 Alexei Ivanovich Abrikosov — pathologist and a member of the Soviet Academy of Sciences 
 Arkady Arkanov - writer, doctor, playwright and stand-up comedian
 Oleg Atkov — cardiologist and astronaut
 Evgeni Babsky — physiologist and member of the Ukrainian Academy of Sciences 
 Jonas Basanavičius — Lithuanian physician, activist and proponent of the Lithuanian National Revival
 Leo Bokeria — cardiac surgeon; academician; recipient of Lenin Prize, USSR State Prize and Russian State Prize 
 Sergey Botkin — clinician, therapist, activist and one of the founders of modern Russian medical science and education
 Anton Chekhov — physician, playwright, and short-story writer
 Mikhail Chumakov — microbiologist and virologist; helped develop the Polio vaccine and organise its mass production
 Mikhail Davydov — medical scientist, oncologist, surgeon; president of Russian Academy of Medical Sciences; recipient of State Prize in Science and Technology 
Grigori Gorin (Grigori Israilevich Ofshtein) - playwright and writer
 Sergei Korsakoff — neuropsychiatrist; europsychiatrist of the 19th century, known for his studies on the effects of alcoholism on the nervous system (Korsakoff syndrome) and introduction of the concept of paranoia
 Anatoly Kudryavitsky — Russian-Irish novelist and poet
 Shabsay Moshkovsky — physician, infectious disease specialist, epidemiologist
 Alexander Podrabinek - dissident, journalist, and commentator
 Vladimir Serbsky — psychiatrist and one of the founders of forensic psychiatry in Russia;  center of forensic psychiatry, Serbsky Center, was named after him
 Pyotr Gannushkin — psychiatrist that developed one of the first theories of psychopathies (today known as personality disorders)
 Nikolay Pirogov — scientist, medical doctor, inventor, pedagogue and member of the Russian Academy of Sciences; considered to be the founder of field surgery and was one of the first surgeons in Europe to use ether as an anaesthetic
 Ivan Sechenov — neurophysiologist; Moscow Medical Academy and Institute of Evolutionary Physiology and Biochemistry were named after him
 Nikolay Sklifosovsky — surgeon, scientist and teacher 
 Maxim Konchalovsky — clinician; figure in Russian internal medicine during first half of the 20th century
 Alexander Myasnikov — physician, cardiologist, academician of the USSR Academy of Medical Sciences
 Dimitri Venediktov — Deputy Health Minister of the USSR 
 Valentin Pokrovsky — epidemiologist; president of Russian Academy of Medical Sciences and director of the Central Research Institute of Epidemiology 
 Valery Shumakov — surgeon and transplantologist; a pioneer of artificial organ surgery; recipient of Russian state's Order of Saint Andrew
 Renat Akchurin — cardiac surgeon; academician 
 Rafiq Tağı — Azerbaijani short-story writer and journalist, graduated in cardiology 
 Amiran Revishvili — Georgian cardiac surgeon and electrophysiologist, president of Pan-Russian Scientific Society of Clinical Electrophysiology, Arrhythmology and Cardiac Pacing
 Boris Yegorov — physician-astronaut who became the first physician to make a space flight

References

External links

Official website 
Official website  
 Clinics of Moscow University
 International Activity Video

Medical schools in Russia
Universities in Moscow